A11 is a motorway (freeway) in Portugal.  It connects Apúlia to Amarante via Guimarães. A11 is operated by Aenor - Auto-Estradas do Norte, S.A.

References

Motorways in Portugal